Oluwafemi Oyeleye Nisty (born 21 October 1994) is a Nigerian professional boxer. As an amateur he won a gold medal in the men's welterweight event at the 2015 African Games.

Professional career

Oyeleye signed his professional contract with Mayweather Promotions in November 2016. On 26 September 2018, he signed JAB Management International Inc.

Professional boxing record

References

External links

1994 births
Living people
People from Lagos
Nigerian male boxers
African Games medalists in boxing
African Games gold medalists for Nigeria
Competitors at the 2015 African Games
Welterweight boxers
Residents of Lagos